Myst Milano is a Canadian rapper and DJ. Their debut album Shapeshyfter was released in 2021, and was longlisted for the 2022 Polaris Music Prize.

Originally from Edmonton, Alberta, Milano is a longtime DJ in Toronto's ballroom community, and is queer and non-binary. The album was launched in part with a performance at Toronto's Garrison club as an opening act for Cadence Weapon at the venue's first live show since the COVID-19 pandemic shutdown of the live music scene.

In October 2021 they also released the non-album single "No Atlas", a collaboration with Montreal producer Mind Bath.

References

21st-century Canadian rappers
Canadian house musicians
Canadian DJs
Black Canadian musicians
Black Canadian LGBT people
Canadian LGBT musicians
Musicians from Edmonton
Non-binary musicians
Living people
Year of birth missing (living people)
21st-century Canadian LGBT people